Bruno "Brunillo" Cirillo (born 21 March 1977) is a former Italian footballer who played as a centre-back.

He moved clubs frequently throughout his career, spending two spells at AEK Athens and a further three years at PAOK, both in Greece, in addition to brief spells in Spain, Cyprus and France.

Cirillo played for Italy at under-21 level and was included in their squad for the 2000 Olympics.

Club career

Italy
Born in Castellammare di Stabia, Cirillo started his career in the ranks of Reggina, and started enjoying regular first-team football after a 1996–97 switch to Serie C2 Tricase Calcio. In the summer of 1998, he returned to Reggina and helped them to promotion to Serie A. The following season was even better, with Cirillo scoring twice in 32 matches and catching the eye of F.C. Internazionale Milano, joining in 2000. He appeared 24 times in his sole season in Milan before moving to U.S. Lecce for 6,000 million lire in co-ownership deal along with Giorgio Frezzolini for 2,500 million lire in co-ownership deal (swapped with Erminio Rullo of Lecce for 3,000 million lire in co-ownership deal and 5,500 million lire cash). In June 2002 Lecce acquired Cirillo (€306,000), Frezzolini (free) and Rullo (€151,000) outright.

Cirillo then returned to Reggina in 2002–03, rejoined Lecce and was loaned to A.C. Siena in quick succession.

AEK Athens
12 months later he switched again, this time to AEK Athens, and proved influential for the Greek runners-up spot in 2006 and 2007. He was a big fan favorite in Athens for his passion, and was under contract until 2008. However, on 29 April 2007 Cirillo played his last match with AEK against Skoda Xanthi in the Greek Super League. Right after the game, for which Cirillo was given the Man of the Match award, the much-spread rumours that he was leaving the club at the end of the season were confirmed.

Later career
On 4 July 2007, Cirillo signed a two-year deal for Spanish outfit Levante UD. In January 2008, due to Levante's inability to pay agreed wages he, alongside countryman Marco Storari left the club, with Cirillo signing for Reggina, the club where he grew as a player. Cirillo mutually terminated his contract with Reggina in June 2009, and later that month PAOK FC signed him until June 2011 on free transfer.

On 28 January 2013, Cirillo signed a six-month deal for French club FC Metz, with the option of a further year. This option was not taken, and on 26 August 2013, Cirillo signed a one-year private agreement for AEK Athens, returning to the club after six years away.

On 21 August 2014, Cirillo was the first pick in the Indian Super League Inaugural International Draft, signed by FC Pune City.

In 2015, he returned to Reggina, the club in which he started his career to finish his career there. He retired in 2015 and now he plans on becoming a manager in the future.

International career
Cirillo played every second of Italy's campaign at the 2000 Olympics in Australia, in which they reached the quarter-finals before elimination by Spain.

Personal life
Cirillo is married with the Greek actress and model Elena Asimakopoulou, and they have one daughter named Maria Rozaria (born: 13 December 2010).

Honours

International
Italy U-21
UEFA European Under-21 Football Championship: 2000

Club
AEK Athens
Football League 2: 2014 (6th Group)

References

External links
 
 

1977 births
Living people
People from Castellammare di Stabia
Footballers from Campania
Association football defenders
Italian footballers
Inter Milan players
Reggina 1914 players
U.S. Lecce players
A.C.N. Siena 1904 players
AEK Athens F.C. players
Levante UD footballers
PAOK FC players
Alki Larnaca FC players
FC Metz players
FC Pune City players
Serie A players
Serie B players
Super League Greece players
La Liga players
Cypriot First Division players
Indian Super League players
Italy under-21 international footballers
Footballers at the 2000 Summer Olympics
Olympic footballers of Italy
Italian expatriate footballers
Expatriate footballers in Greece
Expatriate footballers in Spain
Expatriate footballers in Cyprus
Expatriate footballers in France
Expatriate footballers in India
Italian expatriate sportspeople in Greece
Italian expatriate sportspeople in Spain
Italian expatriate sportspeople in France
Italian expatriate sportspeople in India